Alessio Dante Angelucci (born July 28, 1988) is a South African professional baseball pitcher in the San Diego Padres organization and the South Africa national baseball team. He began his professional career in 2008 with the Arizona League Padres. In 2009 and 2010, he pitched again with the Arizona League Padres and with the Eugene Emeralds. He pitched for South Africa at the 2009 World Baseball Classic.

Alessio is currently represented by Platinum Sports and Entertainment.

References

External links

1988 births
Living people
Arizona League Padres players
Baseball outfielders
Baseball pitchers
De Angelis North East Knights players
Eugene Emeralds players
South African expatriate baseball players in the United States
South African expatriates in Italy
South African people of Italian descent
Sportspeople from Johannesburg
Sydney Blue Sox players
2009 World Baseball Classic players
South African expatriate baseball players in Australia